Metazeunerite is an arsenate mineral with a chemical formula of Cu(UO2)2(AsO4)2·8H2O. The origin of this mineral is almost always from the natural dehydration process of zeunerite.

Named for civil engineer Gustav A. Zeuner who worked at the School of Mines in Freiberg and its lowered hydration state.

Properties 
Its crystal system is tetragonal and its crystal class is 4/m, which is also called the tetragonal-dipyramidal class because it only has a vertical four-fold rotation axis that is perpendicular to the symmetry plane.  When looking at a thin section, metzeunerite is anisotropic, meaning that it has pleochroism. When a mineral is anisotropic, one can see whether it is uniaxial or biaxial, depending on how fast the rays of light are moving through the mineral. This mineral is uniaxial negative due to the ordinary ray being slower than the extraordinary ray.

Occurrence 
Metazeunerite is an uncommon radioactive secondary mineral found in "arsenic bearing hydrothermal uranium deposits" across the world. This widespread mineral occurs specifically in Europe, western North America, Australia, Brazil and Chile, Namibia, and Kazakhstan.  It is currently studied through thermal decomposition by calculating the different levels of dehydration, as zeunerite is transformed into metazeunerite. Metazeunerite was shown to be an important solubility limiting phase controlling uranium migration in the soils of the UK's only, and now abandoned, uranium mine, South Terras, located near St Stephen-in-Brannel.

References

Bibliography
Palache, P.; Berman H.; Frondel, C. (1960). "Dana's System of Mineralogy, Volume II: Halides, Nitrates, Borates, Carbonates, Sulfates, Phosphates, Arsenates, Tungstates, Molybdates, Etc. (Seventh Edition)" John Wiley and Sons, Inc., New York, pp. 993–994.

Arsenate minerals
Copper(II) minerals
Uranium(VI) minerals
Tetragonal minerals
Minerals in space group 85